Baghbanan-e Olya (also Romanized as Bāghbānān-e ‘Olyā and Bāghbānān ‘Olyā; also known as Bāghbānān, Bāghbānān Bālā, Bāghbānān-e Bālā, Bagmanar, and Verkhnyaya Bagmanar) is a village in Kaghazkonan-e Shomali Rural District, Kaghazkonan District, Meyaneh County, East Azerbaijan Province, Iran. At the 2006 census, its population was 52, in 23 families.

References 

Populated places in Meyaneh County